Walter Kendall Myers (born April 15, 1937) is a former U.S. State Department employee who, with his wife, Gwendolyn, was arrested and indicted on June 4, 2009, on charges of spying for Cuba for nearly 30 years. He was convicted of espionage and sentenced to life imprisonment by a U.S. federal court in July 2010.

Background
Kendall Myers is the grandson of Gilbert Hovey Grosvenor and great-grandson of Alexander Graham Bell. He is also related to  William Howard Taft through his father. He was educated at Mercersburg Academy, a private preparatory boarding school in the borough of Mercersburg in Franklin County, Pennsylvania, followed by Brown University in the city of Providence, Rhode Island, from which he graduated, and earned a Ph.D. from Johns Hopkins University in the city of Baltimore, Maryland. In 1977 he began working for the U.S. State Department as a Contract Instructor at its Foreign Service Institute, and for 20 years had been a part-time faculty member at Johns Hopkins' Paul H. Nitze School of Advanced International Studies.  From 2000 until his retirement in October 2007, he worked as a European analyst in the State Department’s Bureau of Intelligence and Research (INR). Myers’ State Department service was primarily in domestic positions. Myers’ spouse, Gwendolyn Steingraber Myers, was never employed by the U.S. Department of State.

US–UK "special relationship" controversy
In November 2006, Myers created controversy by describing the "special relationship" between the United States and the United Kingdom as "one sided" and a "myth". He said that he was "ashamed" of the treatment of Prime Minister Tony Blair by US President George W. Bush.

In response, then UK MP Denis MacShane said, "After the Republican defeat in the midterm election, every little rat who feasted during the Bush years is now leaving the ship. I would respect this gentleman, who I have never heard of, if he had had the guts to make any of these points two or five years ago."

The US State Department distanced itself from Myers' comments, stating, "He was speaking as an academic, not as a representative of the State Department."

Espionage charge
On June 4, 2009, Myers was arrested and charged, along with his wife Gwendolyn Steingraber Myers, with acting as an illegal agent of the Cuban government for nearly 30 years, with providing classified information to that government, and wire fraud. Authorities said that Myers and his wife were caught by an FBI undercover operation and that they had been spying for Cuba for "nearly three decades." Myers’ arrest was the culmination of a three-year joint FBI/Department of State Diplomatic Security Service investigation. Based on general information provided by the FBI, the Diplomatic Security Service conducted a comprehensive internal investigation that resulted in the identification of Myers by Diplomatic Security as the probable Cuban agent, and ultimately led to his arrest.  The authorities also said that Myers usually relied on his memory or notes for information rather than stealing documents. The couple allegedly used shortwave radio to communicate with Cuban intelligence and also were said to have met with Cuban agents in numerous locations both inside and outside the United States. Myers told undercover agents that he had spent an evening with Fidel Castro in 1995.

Alleged motive
It is alleged that the Myers' actions may not have been prompted by greed, but more by ideology. According to a "law enforcement official", they were "true believers" in the Cuban system. The United States federal affidavit quoted a diary entry by Kendall Myers as saying, "I can see nothing of value that has been lost by the revolution. The revolution has released enormous potential and liberated the Cuban spirit", and referred to Fidel Castro as "one of the great political leaders of our time." Other entries quoted reference a comparison of health care in the United States and healthcare in Cuba, and "complacency about the poor" in the United States.

Plea

The Myerses pleaded guilty on November 20, 2009, at a hearing before Judge Reggie Walton in U.S. District Court. Myers, 72, pled guilty to a three-count criminal information charging him with conspiracy to commit espionage and two counts of wire fraud. His wife, Gwendolyn Steingraber Myers, 71, pleaded guilty to a one-count criminal information charging her with conspiracy to gather and transmit national defense information. As part of his plea agreement, Kendall Myers agreed to serve a life prison sentence and to cooperate fully with the United States government regarding any criminal activity and intelligence activity by him or others. As part of her plea agreement, Gwendolyn agreed to serve a sentence of between six and seven and a half years in prison and to cooperate fully with the United States government.

Sentence
On July 16, 2010, Kendall Myers was sentenced to life imprisonment without possibility of parole. His wife Gwendolyn was sentenced to a total of 81 months in prison. Myers is currently incarcerated at the federal ADX Florence supermax facility in Colorado.

Reaction

United States
United States Secretary of State Hillary Clinton ordered that a damage assessment be done to investigate the extent of damage done to United States security.  In addition, the Secretary directed the Department to conduct a comprehensive damage assessment in coordination with the intelligence community in accordance with established damages protocols and regulations.

Cuba

Upon hearing the news of Myers' arrest, Fidel Castro stated that the case read like "an espionage comic strip". The former Cuban leader declined to say whether the Myers couple really had passed secrets to the Cuban government, but added that they deserved praise if they did.

See also
Ana Montes

References

Johns Hopkins University faculty
Brown University alumni
Cuba–United States relations
United States Department of State officials
1937 births
Living people
American people convicted of spying for Cuba
People from Baddeck, Nova Scotia
Inmates of ADX Florence
Prisoners sentenced to life imprisonment by the United States federal government